Twisted Desire is a 1996 American television drama/thriller film directed by Craig R. Baxley, written by twin brothers Carey and Chad Hayes. It stars Melissa Joan Hart, with real-life domestic partners Daniel Baldwin and Isabella Hoffman. The movie also stars Meadow Sisto, David Lascher, and R&B/pop star Jeremy Jordan. The picture made its debut on May 13, 1996, 9/8c on NBC.

The film is based on the 1990 murders of the parents of 14-year-old Jessica Wiseman. Jessica had her 17-year-old boyfriend, Douglas Christopher Thomas, shoot and kill her parents. Thomas was executed in 2000, when the death penalty for juveniles was still a legal punishment.

Plot

Repressed teenager Jennifer Stanton (Hart) is constantly at odds with her exceedingly-strict parents, who intensely dislike Jennifer's friends as well as her taste in clothing. Her father William (Baldwin) is an aggressive control-freak; his attitude has an adverse impact upon Jennifer's relationships, particularly with Brad (Lascher) - the captain of her high school football team. Brad ultimately breaks up with Jennifer, ostensibly because William keeps them apart, but also because another girl at school has him interested. Jennifer is shocked and frustrated by all of this.

Jennifer meets Nick Ryan (Jordan) at a gas station and soon forms a close relationship with him, which she keeps secret from her parents. Nick has a reputation for having spent time in jail on an assault charge. When Jennifer's parents spend a weekend away from the house, Jennifer uses the opportunity to get closer with Nick. Not trusting Jennifer, her parents return home early. They catch her in their bed with Nick. William furiously chases Nick out of the house, although Jennifer insists that she's in love with him. She continues dating Nick secretly, and uses makeup to convince him that William gave her a black eye. Concerned, Nick asks Jennifer to stay with him. She is touched by his offer, but declines. Back home, Jennifer's mother Susan (Hoffman) expresses disgust with the girl for having sex behind her parents' backs. She takes William's side against their daughter and her friends. Jennifer is grounded for the rest of the school year.

Nick visits Jennifer's house, and proclaims his love for her. He also states what he thinks of the harsh manner in which William treats Jennifer. William, shocked by Nick's audacity, threatens to sue him for statutory rape. He also threatens Nick with dire physical injury. The next morning, William finds his car vandalized and contacts the police. Nick is questioned, but denies all knowledge of the incident. Jennifer, knowing of her father's determination to have Nick imprisoned, convinces him to get his grandfather's pistol and kill her parents. While he plans out the murder, Jennifer tells her friends at school that she and Nick have broken up. She also presents herself to William and Susan as their idea of a model teenager. Although convinced that Jennifer has reformed and become truthful, her dad and mom couldn't care less. Despite not liking Jennifer's friends, William and Susan let their daughter go for once to a slumber party (where one girl has whipped cream sprayed messily into her mouth). On the night for which they've scheduled her parents' murder, Nick reconsiders the plan at the last moment; with Jennifer's vehement encouragement, however, he goes through with it.

After the killings, which the police presume were done by a burglar, Jennifer is sent to live with her grandmother Rose. Nick, the prime suspect, is harassed by the cops. Jennifer rekindles her relationship with Brad. She calls the police anonymously with information that leads to their discovery of the gun with which Nick murdered her parents. With Nick in custody, the case seems to be closed. However, Detective Daniels (Eric Laneuville) suspects that Jennifer knows more regarding this case than she let on during police interrogation. When confronted, Jennifer claims that Nick was angry at her parents for not letting him see her, thereby explaining Nick's motive. Meanwhile, Jennifer's best friend Karen Winkler (Sisto) finds her diary; it reveals how Jennifer used Nick to do away with her parents so that she could have Brad.

Karen visits Nick in jail, and tells him how he's been set up by Jennifer. When he confronts Jennifer about it, she angrily blows Nick off, blaming him entirely for the murders of her dad and mom. Upset, he admits to the police that he killed William and Susan, but that it was Jennifer's idea. The police claim Jennifer's diary as evidence, only to find that she has rewritten the journal and thus made it useless. Frustrated, Karen sneaks into Jennifer's house to search for additional evidence; she fails to discover anything, and narrowly escapes being caught in the act. At Nick's murder trial, Jennifer falsely testifies that Nick harassed her. When Karen's determination to stop her becomes apparent, Jennifer threatens to implicate her in the murders of William and Susan. Eventually, a wired Brad manipulates Jennifer into admitting responsibility for her parents' deaths. The police pop in to arrest Jennifer for murdering her parents.

An epilogue reveals that Jennifer Stanton was tried as a juvenile; thus, her release from prison at age 21 would be mandatory...while Nick Ryan is now on death row.

Cast
Melissa Joan Hart as Jennifer Stanton
Daniel Baldwin as William Stanton
Jeremy Jordan as Nick Ryan
Meadow Sisto as Karen Winkler
Kurt Fuller as Detective Becker
David Lascher as Brad
Eric Laneuville as Detective Daniels
Collin Wilcox Paxton as Rose Stanton
Isabella Hofmann as Susan Stanton

External links

1990s English-language films
1996 films
1996 television films
American films based on actual events
Films directed by Craig R. Baxley
Films scored by Gary Chang
NBC network original films